Robert Cutler (1895–1974) was an American government official who was the first person appointed as the National Security Advisor.

Robert Cutler may also refer to:
Robert B. Cutler (1913–2010), American rower and conspiracy theorist
Robert Barry Cutler (1810–1882), Canadian politician who served in the Canadian House of Commons from 1872 to 1874
Robert M. Cutler (1784–1883), Canadian merchant and political figure
Robert S. Cutler (born 1956), American marketing executive and the founder of Creative Consumer Concepts